Texico Municipal Schools is a K-12 school district headquartered in Texico, New Mexico.

Most of the district is located in Curry County, with a section in Roosevelt County.

History

In 1974 the district's proposed $150,000 bond to construct a new middle school was approved by the voting public.

Schools
All schools and the district administration are at the same address:
 Texico Elementary School
 Texico Middle School
 Texico High School

References

External links
 Texico Municipal Schools
School districts in New Mexico
Education in Curry County, New Mexico
Education in Roosevelt County, New Mexico